Entada gigas, commonly known as the monkey-ladder, sea bean, cœur de la mer  or sea heart, is a species of flowering liana in the pea family, Fabaceae of the Mimosa subfamily, which is often raised to family rank (Mimosaceae). They are native to Central America, the Caribbean, northern South America, and Africa. There have been reports of pods up to eight feet (2.5 meters) in length. This pod, like all legumes, is a single carpel, the largest carpel of any known plant. The seeds contain a hollow cavity, which gives them buoyancy. After being washed by rain into rivers and then the ocean, the seeds of E. gigas drift long distances on ocean currents. Seed buoyancy and vitality lasts at least two years.

References

External links
Journey of a Sea Heart (Entada gigas)

gigas
Flora of Africa
Flora of the Caribbean
Flora of Central America
Flora of Colombia
Flora of Venezuela
Decorative fruits and seeds
Pantropical flora
Flora without expected TNC conservation status